Corsocasis gastrozona is a moth in the family Schreckensteiniidae. It was described by Edward Meyrick in 1932.

References

Schreckensteinioidea
Moths described in 1932